In enzymology, a NAD+ synthase is an enzyme that catalyzes the chemical reaction

ATP + deamido-NAD+ + NH3  AMP + diphosphate + NAD+

The 3 substrates of this enzyme are ATP, deamido-NAD+, and NH3, whereas its 3 products are AMP, diphosphate, and NAD+.

This enzyme belongs to the family of ligases, specifically those forming carbon-nitrogen bonds as acid-D-ammonia (or amine) ligases (amide synthases).  The systematic name of this enzyme class is deamido-NAD+:ammonia ligase (AMP-forming). Other names in common use include NAD+ synthetase, NAD+ synthase, nicotinamide adenine dinucleotide synthetase, and diphosphopyridine nucleotide synthetase.  This enzyme participates in nicotinate and nicotinamide metabolism and nitrogen metabolism.

Structural studies

References

 

EC 6.3.1
NADH-dependent enzymes
Enzymes of known structure